Kurtziella newcombei is a species of sea snail, a marine gastropod mollusk in the family Mangeliidae.

Description
The length of the shell attains 11 mm, its diameter 4 mm.

(Original description) The small shell is brownish, with a tendency to banding, paler at the shoulder and on the base. It contains six whorls, including a small, smooth protoconch whorl. The suture is distinct, slightly appressed, with no fasciolar constriction. The spiral sculpture consists of fine flattish threads separated by narrow striae very minutely reticulated by the incremental lines and most conspicuous in the intervals between the ribs, practically covering the whole surface of the shell. The axial sculpture, beside almost microscopic lines of growth, consists of (on the body whorl 14) short rounded
ribs, slightly angulated at the shoulder and extending from the suture to the siphonal canal with subequal interspaces. The anal sulcus is shallow. The aperture is narrow and simple. The inner lip is erased. The siphonal canal is short, and straight.

Distribution
This marine species occurs off Vancouver Island, Canada.

References

External links
  Tucker, J.K. 2004 Catalog of recent and fossil turrids (Mollusca: Gastropoda). Zootaxa 682:1–1295.

newcombei
Gastropods described in 1919